Arshdeep Singh Dosanjh (born 30 July 1996) is an Australian professional volleyball player. He is a member of the Australia national team. During his career, he has played, among others in Finland, Switzerland and Poland, and has represented Australia in major international competitions. At the professional club level, he plays for BBTS Bielsko-Biała.

References

External links
 
 Player profile at LegaVolley.it 
 Player profile at PlusLiga.pl 
 Player profile at Volleybox.net

1996 births
Living people
People from Manly, New South Wales
Sportspeople from Sydney
Australian men's volleyball players
Australian expatriate sportspeople in Finland
Expatriate volleyball players in Finland
Australian expatriate sportspeople in Switzerland
Expatriate volleyball players in Switzerland
Australian expatriate sportspeople in Poland
Expatriate volleyball players in Poland
Australian expatriate sportspeople in Qatar
Expatriate volleyball players in Qatar
Australian expatriate sportspeople in Turkey
Expatriate volleyball players in Turkey
Australian expatriate sportspeople in Italy
Expatriate volleyball players in Italy
Australian expatriate sportspeople in Germany
Expatriate volleyball players in Germany
Warta Zawiercie players
BBTS Bielsko-Biała players
Setters (volleyball)